JBM is a Canadian singer songwriter.

JBM may also refer to:
 the Journal of Basic Microbiology, an academic journal
 Jimmy Barry-Murphy (born 1954), Irish Gaelic footballer and hurler
 John Bowes Morrell (1873–1963), English author and historian
 J. B. M. Hertzog (1866–1942), Boer general during the second Anglo-Boer War